Kahbad-e Do (also Romanized as Kahbād-e Do; also known as Kūbād-e Morādī) is a village in Howmeh-ye Sharqi Rural District, in the Central District of Izeh County, Khuzestan Province, Iran. At the 2006 census, its population was 1,448, in 249 families.

References 

Populated places in Izeh County